The 2013 Arimex ATP Challenger Trophy was a professional tennis tournament played on clay courts. It was the seventh edition of the tournament which was part of the 2013 ATP Challenger Tour. It took place at the TC EMPIRE in Trnava, Slovakia from 14 to 22 September 2013, including the qualifying competition on the first two days.

Singles main draw entrants

Seeds

Other entrants
The following players received wildcards into the singles main draw:
  Pavol Červenák 
  Adam Pavlásek
  Martin Přikryl
  Mike Urbanija

The following players received entry from the qualifying draw:
  Riccardo Bellotti 
  Pascal Brunner
  Nikola Čačić 
  Antal van der Duim

Champions

Singles

 Julian Reister def.  Adrian Ungur 7–6(7–3), 6–3

Doubles

 Marin Draganja /  Mate Pavić def.  Aljaž Bedene /  Jaroslav Pospíšil 7–5, 4–6, [10–6]

References

External links
Official Website

 
Trophy
Arimex Challenger Trophy
STRABAG Challenger Open